Gieldon may refer to:
Giełdon, Chojnice County, Poland
Giełdoń, Słupsk County, Poland